Poor is an adjective related to a state of poverty.

Poor or The poor may also refer to:

Places
Pur, Iran (also romanized as poor), a village in Hormozgan Province, Iran
Poor Mountain, a mountain in Virginia
Poor Valley, a valley in Tennessee and Virginia

People with the name
 Charles Henry Poor (1808–1882), a United States Navy officer
 Charles Lane Poor (1866–1951), an American astronomer
 Edward Erie Poor (1837–1900), an American banker, president of the National Park Bank
 Enoch Poor (1736–1780), an American general in the American Revolutionary War
 Henry Poor (disambiguation), various people
 Janet Meakin Poor (born 1929), an American landscape design specialist from Winnetka, Illinois
 John A. Poor (1808–1871), an American lawyer, editor, and railroad entrepreneur
 Salem Poor (1747–1802), an African-American slave and American Revolutionary War soldier

Music
 The Poor (American band), American rock band
 The Poor (Australian band), Australian rock band

See also 
 
 Poor Boy (disambiguation)
 Poore, a surname
 Por (disambiguation)
 Pore (disambiguation)
 Poverty (disambiguation)